KNR may refer to:

 Jam Airport, in Bandar Kangan, Iran; IATA airport code KNR
 Kalaallit Nunaata Radioa, Greenlandic Broadcasting Corporation
 Kaningra language, ISO 639-3 language code KNR
 Kannur, Kerala, India; UN/LOCODE IN-KL-KNR
 Kensal Rise railway station, England, station code
 Kunar Province, Afghanistan; ISO 3166-2:AF code AF-KNR